Santiago de la Parte de las Cuevas (born August 18, 1948 in Amusco, Palencia) is a retired male long-distance runner from Spain, who represented his native country at the 1984 Summer Olympics in the men's marathon. He set his personal best (2:11:10) on February 12, 1984, finishing in third place at the Tokyo Marathon. De la Parte twice won the national marathon title during his career: 1982 and 1986. He is a three-time winner of the Cross Internacional de Venta de Baños: 1980, 1981 and 1982.

Achievements

References
 sports-reference
 ARRS 1984 Year Ranking

1948 births
Living people
Spanish male long-distance runners
Athletes (track and field) at the 1984 Summer Olympics
Olympic athletes of Spain